The House of Bothmer is the name of an ancient German noble comital family whose members occupied significant positions in the Kingdom of Hanover and later within the German Empire.

Notable members 
 Dietrich von Bothmer (1918–2009), German-born art historian
 Felix Graf von Bothmer (1852–1937), German general
 Hans Caspar von Bothmer (1656-1732), Hanoverian politician
 Lenelotte von Bothmer (1915–1997), German politician (SPD)

German-language surnames